Political violence in Turkey became a serious problem in the late 1970s and was even described as a "low-level war". The death squads of Turkish right-wing ultranationalist groups, sometimes allied with the state, against the resistance of the left-wing opposition inflicted some 5,000 casualties. Most of the victims were left-wingers. The level of violence lessened for a while after the 1980 Turkish coup d'état until the Kurdish-Turkish conflict erupted in 1984.

Background
In 1975 Süleyman Demirel, president of the conservative Justice Party (AP) succeeded Bülent Ecevit, president of the social-democratic Republican People's Party (CHP) as Prime Minister. He formed a coalition, the Nationalist Front, with Necmettin Erbakan's Islamist National Salvation Party (MSP), and Alparslan Türkeş' far-right Nationalist Movement Party (MHP). The MHP used the opportunity to infiltrate state security services, seriously worsening the low-intensity war that had been waging between rival factions.

The elections of 1977 had no winner. Demirel at first continued the coalition with the Nationalist Front, but in 1978, Ecevit came to power again with the help of some deputies who had changed party. In 1979, Demirel once again became prime minister. At the end of the 1970s, Turkey was in an unstable situation with unsolved economic and social problems and facing large strike actions and partial paralysis of parliamentary politics (the Grand National Assembly of Turkey was unable to elect a president during the six months preceding the coup). Since 1969, proportional representation had made it difficult for one party to achieve a parliamentary majority. The interests of the industrial bourgeoisie, who were economically dominant, were opposed by other social classes, such as smaller industrialists, traders, rural notables and landlords, whose interests did not always coincide among themselves. Numerous agricultural and industrial reforms sought by parts of the upper-middle classes were blocked by others. The politicians seemed unable to combat the growing violence in the country.

Sequence of events
Unprecedented political violence erupted in Turkey in the late 1970s. The overall death toll of the 1970s is estimated at 5,000, with nearly ten assassinations per day. Most were members of left-wing and right-wing political organizations, which were then engaged in bitter fighting. The ultranationalist Grey Wolves, the youth organisation of the MHP, claimed they were supporting the security forces. According to the British Searchlight magazine, in 1978 there were 3,319 fascist attacks, in which 831 were killed and 3,121 wounded. In the central trial against the left-wing organization Devrimci Yol (Revolutionary Path) at Ankara Military Court, the defendants listed 5,388 political killings before the military coup. Among the victims were 1,296 right-wingers and 2,109 left-wingers. The others could not clearly be related. The 1978 Bahçelievler massacre, the 1977 Taksim Square massacre with 35 victims and the 1978 Maraş massacre with over 100 victims are some notable incidents. Martial law was announced following the Maraş massacre in 14 of the then 67 provinces in December 1978. At the time of the coup, martial law had been extended to 20 provinces.

Ecevit was warned about the coming coup in June 1979 by Nuri Gündeş of the National Intelligence Organization (MİT). Ecevit then told his interior minister, İrfan Özaydınlı, who then told Sedat Celasun, one of the five generals who would lead the coup. The deputy undersecretary of the MİT, Nihat Yıldız, was demoted to the London consulate and replaced by a lieutenant general as a result.

Kurdish separatism
The right-wing groups were opposed to Kurdish separatism. Disproportionate numbers of Kurds were part of the left-wing groups. Before the 1980 military coup, the majority of violent clashes were between leftist and rightist groups, though the separatist attacks against the Turkish forces increased afterwards.

An amendment of the electoral law in 1969 kept small parties on both sides to gain any seats in Parliament. This caused a public uprising, including the Kurdish resistance. Multiple Kurdish leftist organisations appeared in Turkey in the 1960s and 1970s that were ready to use violence as a political tool. Violence sparked especially in the second half of the 1970s. Throughout the years, a number of them fell apart or were banned altogether after the 1980 military coup. After becoming increasingly involved in political activism after its foundation in 1978, the Kurdistan Workers' Party (PKK) led by Abdullah Öcalan would rise quickly to be one of the major separatist actors. As a militant political organisation, the PKK claimed 354 lives between the years 1978 and 1980. Most of the victims were ethnic Kurds as they constituted PKK's main target group. For example, tribal leaders were against the PKK's goals and values, which was why the PKK fought against them.

The Kurdistan Worker's Party did not only use violence to mobilise people during this time period. However, their use of violence did appeal to larger crowds, increasing the popularity of the party. By gaining more people to support them, other organisations were not able to gain similar status as the PKK did. Thus, the PKK was the main access of the Kurdish to political participation in Turkey. One way of involving a larger number of people in its activities was to include women, which challenged the traditional gender relations in the country.

Aftermath 
Following the ongoing political violence of the 1970s and the Turkish parliament's inability to form a stable government and fulfil its function as legislative, the 12 September Military Coup brought Kenan Evren to power. The parliament was abolished, martial law was declared and a state of emergency was put into place. The period of military dictatorship between 1980 and 1983 constituted a fundamentally transformational period for Turkish society.

The National Security Council became responsible for the close monitoring of society, aimed at those who participated in any form of state resistance in the 1970s. Estimated numbers of the people facing punishment by the state 1980-1983 are listed in the table below.

A culture of mutual denunciation was developed among the citizenry and the formation of organisations banned, leading to a nationwide atmosphere of social anxiety and polarization into two groups: those who were innocent and those who were guilty. In addition, nationalism was coupled with Islamization in order to formulate a new Turkish national identity and promote morality. The National Security council owned the public broadcasting channel, Turkish radio and the television institution. Both Islamization and the nationalization of important media channels acted as ways to further discipline the population.

The military coup also allowed for a restructuring of the state; 535 laws were passed in the 1982 Turkish Constitution. Among them were laws that enabled a shift from a state-controlled to a market economy with a developmentalist approach. However, with the 24th January Decisions, real wages dropped significantly and the establishment of small businesses was hampered, whereas the way was paved for larger corporations, new networks of exportation and multinational organisations. A development program for Southeastern Anatolia (Güneydoğu Anadolu Projesi) was established in order to help the dominantly Kurdish population to more economic prosperity but did not include anyone from the region to make the program cooperative and successful. Instead, reforms were designed to be much in favour of the bourgeoisie all while it worsened the situation of the middle class significantly with a plummeting of real wages.

Among other reasons, Kurdish separatism was reinforcing the economic backwardness of the Eastern and Southeastern Anatolia while the economic backwardness of Eastern and Southeastern Anatolia reinforced Kurdish separatism. Terrorist attacks have had an impact on human and physical capital, and what the state spent on countering the movement shifted spendings from the infrastructure and development of the region to the defence. However, this simultaneously marginalised Kurdish who would then be recruited by the PKK as lower-class. Thus, economic backwardness and Kurdish separatism created a vicious circle.

Regarding minority rights and freedoms, there were many setbacks. Exclusionary nationalism was promoted. For the Kurdish, the acknowledgement of their existence and the use of their language were banned entirely. Any type of Kurdish media was forbidden, and publishers were imprisoned. Political parties, trade unions and NGOs were abolished. The Turkish Armed Forces fought against PKK influence in Southeast Anatolia and at the Iraqi border and implemented a guard system in order to make villagers fight against the PKK with them. For Alevis, Islamisation acted as an assimilationist state policy because it was Sunni Islam that was practiced. Many mosques were built in Alevi districts and the religious courses offered were all Sunni as well. This marginalization would lead to the 1984 Kurdish-Turkish conflict and the rise of the PKK.

See also
Years of Lead (Italy)
1971 Turkish military memorandum
New Çeltek events
List of assassinated people from Turkey
List of massacres in Turkey

References

Political violence in Turkey
1976 in Turkey
1977 in Turkey
1978 in Turkey
1979 in Turkey
1980 in Turkey
Conflicts in 1976
Conflicts in 1977
Conflicts in 1978
Conflicts in 1979
Conflicts in 1980
Conflicts in Turkey
Communism in Turkey
Communist terrorism
Economic history of Turkey
Far-left politics in Turkey
Grey Wolves (organization)
Maoism in Turkey
Military history of Turkey
Neo-fascist terrorism
Political history of Turkey
Turkey
Riots and civil disorder in Turkey
Turkish nationalism